Nichole Banna popularly known as Virgin Mary is a Nollywood actress and producer who has featured in various film. She produced the movie, Icheke Oku which is of Igbo origin.

Early life and education 
According to an interview with punch newspaper and sunnews, the Nollywood actress of Imo state origin went to Oliver heights international School in Portharcourt for her primary education and Emmy Norberton International school for secondary education. She bagged a B.Sc. degree in computer science at River State University of science and Technology.

Career 
She has acted in different films and produced a movie so far titled Icheke Oku .

Filmography 

Icheke Oku
Bound
Deepest cut
Just one night

Award and nomination 
She was nominated for the Best actress in the leading Role at the BON award, 2016.

See also 
Jumoke Odetola
Bound(2018 film)
Matilda Lambert

References 

Living people
Rivers State University alumni
Igbo actresses
Actresses from Imo State
Nigerian film producers
Nigerian women film producers
Nigerian media executives
21st-century Nigerian actresses
Nigerian actresses
20th-century Nigerian actresses
Year of birth missing (living people)